Digitel may refer to:

 Digitel GSM, a mobile phone company in Venezuela
 Digital Telecommunications Philippines, commonly known as Digitel, a mobile telecommunications company in the Philippines 
 Digitel Mobile Philippines, Inc., doing business as Sun Cellular, a subsidiary 
 Digitel Wireless, a wireless broadband integrator in the southeastern United States

See also

Data communication